Sady-Kolonia  is a village in the administrative district of Gmina Klwów, within Przysucha County, Masovian Voivodeship, in east-central Poland.

References

Sady-Kolonia